Bagaslaviškis is a town in Širvintos district municipality, Vilnius County, east Lithuania. According to the Lithuanian census of 2011, the town had a population of 110 people. The town has a church of Catholics.

Famous citizens 
Rimantas Didžiokas, Lithuanian transport minister.

References

Towns in Vilnius County
Towns in Lithuania